Kandhavanam is a village in the Papanasam taluk of Thanjavur district, Tamil Nadu, India.

Demographics 

As per the 2001 census, Kandhavanam had a total population of 704 with 343 males and 361 females. The sex ratio was 1052. The literacy rate was 60.63.

References 

 

Villages in Thanjavur district